Myoxinus is a genus of beetles in the family Cerambycidae, containing the following species:

 Myoxinus asper Bates, 1880
 Myoxinus pictus (Erichson, 1847)

References

Acanthoderini